In set theory, a Woodin cardinal (named for W. Hugh Woodin) is a cardinal number  such that for all functions

there exists a cardinal  with

 

and an elementary embedding

from the Von Neumann universe  into a transitive inner model  with critical point  and

(See also strong cardinal.)

A Woodin cardinal is preceded by a stationary set of measurable cardinals, and thus it is a Mahlo cardinal. However, the first Woodin cardinal is not even weakly compact.

Consequences 

Woodin cardinals are important in descriptive set theory.  By a result of Martin and Steel, existence of infinitely many Woodin cardinals implies projective determinacy, which in turn implies that every projective set is Lebesgue measurable, has the Baire property (differs from an open set by a meager set, that is, a set which is a countable union of nowhere dense sets), and the perfect set property (is either countable or contains a perfect subset).

The consistency of the existence of Woodin cardinals can be proved using determinacy hypotheses.  Working in ZF+AD+DC one can prove that  is Woodin in the class of hereditarily ordinal-definable sets.  is the first ordinal onto which the continuum cannot be mapped by an ordinal-definable surjection (see Θ (set theory)).

Mitchell and Steel showed that assuming a Woodin cardinal exists, there is an inner model containing a Woodin cardinal in which there is a -well-ordering of the reals, ◊ holds, and the generalized continuum hypothesis holds.

Hyper-Woodin cardinals
A cardinal  is called hyper-Woodin if there exists a normal measure  on  such that for every set , the set

 is --strong

 is --strong if and only if for each  there is a transitive class  and an elementary embedding

with

, and

.

The name alludes to the classical result that a cardinal is Woodin if and only if for every set , the set

 is --strong

is a stationary set.

The measure  will contain the set of all Shelah cardinals below .

Weakly hyper-Woodin cardinals

The name alludes to the classic result that a cardinal is Woodin if for every set , the set  is --strong is stationary.

The difference between hyper-Woodin cardinals and weakly hyper-Woodin cardinals is that the choice of  does not depend on the choice of the set  for hyper-Woodin cardinals.

Notes and references

Further reading 
 
 For proofs of the two results listed in consequences see Handbook of Set Theory (Eds. Foreman, Kanamori, Magidor) (to appear).  Drafts of some chapters are available.
 Ernest Schimmerling, Woodin cardinals, Shelah cardinals and the Mitchell-Steel core model, Proceedings of the American Mathematical Society 130/11, pp. 3385–3391, 2002, online
 

Large cardinals
Determinacy